Acompsia tripunctella is a moth of the family Gelechiidae. It is found in the Alps, Apennines, Carpathians and the Balkans. There are also records from European Russia, Transbaikalia and the Caucasus, but these require confirmation. The habitat consists of clearings and edges of forests, steppe slopes and meadows up to the alpine zone.

The wingspan is 19–23 mm for males and 16–18 mm for females. The forewings are clay-brown to greyish brown, mottled with light greyish, yellow brown and some black scales. The hindwings are grey. Adults are on wing from June to September.

The larvae feed on Plantago alpina. Full-grown larvae reach a length of 12–13 mm. They are black brown slightly tinged with greenish. They overwinter in a silken tube covered with leaf litter. Pupation takes place in June on the ground in a loose cocoon.

References

Moths described in 1775
Acompsia
Moths of Europe